This is a list of notable people who are from Limerick city or county, Ireland, or have strong associations with either.

Arts

G. E. M. Anscombe, English philosopher and theologian, born in Limerick
Kevin Barry, author, born in Limerick in 1969
Tomás de Bhaldraithe (1916–1996), Irish language scholar and lexicographer
David Noel Bourke, screenwriter and film director
Máire Bradshaw, poet and publisher
Vincent Browne, journalist and broadcaster
Mairead Buicke, opera singer
Jimmy Carr, comedian and writer
Denise Chaila, rapper
David Chambers, aka Blindboy Boatclub, satirist, musician, podcaster, author, and TV presenter
Tony Clarkin, actor of stage, television, radio, film; voice-over artist
Michael Curtin, author
Cliodhna Cussen, sculptor
Lawrence Doheny, writer, producer, director of Six Million Dollar Man and Magnum PI
Desmond FitzGerald, 29th Knight of Glin, President of the Irish Georgian Society
David Gleeson, writer and director of the feature films Cowboys & Angels and The Front Line
Richard Graves, theological scholar and author
Gerald Griffin (1803–1840), novelist, poet and playwright
Richard Harris, actor
Catherine Hayes, soprano
Mike Hogan, member of pop band The Cranberries 
Noel Hogan, member of pop band The Cranberries
Celia Holman Lee, model agent and TV presenter
Richard D. James aka Aphex Twin, electronic musician
Charles Johnstone, novelist
Patrick Weston Joyce, historian, music-collector, onomastician, and lexicographer
Robert Dwyer Joyce, poet, song-writer, Fenian, and physician
Sean Keating, painter
Jon Kenny, member of D'unbelievables comedy duo; regular member of the Father Ted series
Emma Langford, folk singer-songwriter
Fergal Lawler, member of pop band The Cranberries
Gearóid Mac Eoin, academic whose studies have focused on aspects of Irish language, literature and history
Ciaran MacMathuna, broadcaster and musicologist
Alphie McCourt, author of A Long Stones Throw, Heartscald (The Soulswimmer, US title)
Frank McCourt, author of Angela's Ashes, 'Tis and Teacher Man
Malachy McCourt, actor and writer
Conor McNamara, sports commentator
Tyron Montgomery, Oscar-winning film director
Leanne Moore, singer and TV presenter
Ruth Negga, film and TV actress
Kate O'Brien, author
Emma O'Driscoll, member of pop band Six; television presenter
Críostóir Ó Floinn, poet and playwright
Daragh O'Malley, leading stage and TV actor, star of ITV's Sharpe TV series. 
Dolores O'Riordan, member of pop band The Cranberries
Matthew Potter, author
Arthur Quinlan, local journalist formerly based at Shannon Airport for the Irish Times
Liam Redmond, stage, TV and film actor, active from the 1940s to the 1970s
The Rubberbandits, comedy hip-hop duo
Darren Shan, internationally published children's author
Sharon Slater, author
Constance Smith, Hollywood actress of the 1950s
Bill Whelan, Grammy Award-winning composer of Riverdance and many other works
Terry Wogan, presenter on BBC radio and television

Business

Sir Thomas Cleeve, founder and chairman of the Condensed Milk Company of Ireland, High Sheriff of Limerick city (1899, 1900, and 1908)
Patrick Collison, CEO of Stripe
Dermot FitzGerald, businessman and philanthropist
JP McManus, businessman, entrepreneur and philanthropist

Science
Laurence Cussen, East India Company surveyor who triangulated the Auckland Province (1876), photographed Māori (1884) and published research in the colony of New Zealand.
William Henry Harvey, algae botanist, born Summerville, County Limerick
Lady Mary Heath, pioneering aviator who flew from Cape Town to London (1928) and set records for altitude in a light aircraft (1927). The first female to complete a mechanic qualification in the US, parachute from an aeroplane (1927) and have a commercial pilot licence in Britain (1927)
John Philip Holland, invented the submarine (1881).
Mary McCoy, an Irish nurse who served during the American Civil War at the Battle of Fair Oaks and met President Lincoln.
Sylvester O'Halloran, invented cataract surgery (1750)
Michael O'Shaughnessy, designed the San Francisco streetcar system (1927), the O'Shaughnessy Dam (1923) and the Hetch Hetchy Aqueduct (1923).
William Brooke O'Shaughnessy, early anaesthetist who introduced the therapeutic use of cannabis to Western medicine (1838), pioneered intravenous fluid therapy to treat cholera (1831) and established a telegraph system in India (1852).

Politics

Serena Armstrong-Jones, Countess of Snowdon, wife of the Earl of Snowdon, and member, by marriage, of the extended British Royal Family
James P. Boyd, businessman and politician in Ontario, Canada
Kathleen Clarke (1878-1972), First Lady Mayoress of Dublin, widow of Tom Clarke
Niall Collins, Irish politician
Stephen Coughlan (Labour), TD 1961–77; Mayor of Limerick 1951–52, 1969–70
Pat Cox, TD 1992–94; MEP 1989–2004; President of the European Parliament 2002–04
Éamon de Valera (Fianna Fáil), TD; Taoiseach; President of Ireland; raised in Bruree, Co. Limerick
Frances Fitzgerald
Michael D. Higgins, elected President of Ireland in 2011.
Jim Kemmy (Labour and Democratic Socialist Party), TD 1981–1982, 1987–1997; Mayor of Limerick 1991–92, 1995–96
Michael Lipper (Labour), TD 1977–81; Mayor of Limerick 1973–74
Michael Noonan (Fine Gael), TD 1981–present; former Leader of Fine Gael; Minister for Justice, Minister for Health
Dan Neville
Tom Neville
Willie O'Dea (Fianna Fáil), TD, 1982–present; Minister for Defence
Kieran O'Donnell
Desmond O'Malley (Fianna Fáil and Progressive Democrats), TD, 1968–2002; founder and Leader of the Progressive Democrats
Donogh O'Malley (Fianna Fáil), TD 1954–1968; Minister for Health and Minister for Education
Tim O'Malley (Progressive Democrats), TD 2002–2007, Minister of State for Health
Jan O'Sullivan (Labour), TD 1998–present; Mayor of Limerick 1993–94
Peter Power, TD for Limerick East (2002–2011), Overseas Development minister (2008–2011), born in Limerick
Patrick L. Quinlan (1883–1948), Irish-American radical journalist and political activist, born in Limerick

Sport

Tim Ahearne, athlete; Olympic gold medallist with Great Britain and Ireland – triple jump (1908) 
Tom Aherne, soccer player; Limerick FC; Luton Town FC; Republic of Ireland (16 Caps)
Richie Bennis, hurler; Patrickswell; Limerick; 1 GAA All Stars Awards; 1 All-Ireland – 1973
Ciarán Carey, hurler; Patrickswell; Limerick; 3 GAA All Stars Awards;
Peter Clohessy, rugby player; Young Munster; Munster; Ireland (54 Caps)
Eamonn Cregan, hurler; Claughan; Limerick; 3 GAA All Stars Awards; 1 All-Ireland – 1973
Tim Cuneen, soccer player; Limerick FC; Coleraine FC; Republic of Ireland (1 Cap)
Sean Cusack, soccer player; Limerick FC; Republic of Ireland (1 Cap)
Keith Earls, rugby player; Young Munster; Munster; Ireland (65 Caps); British and Irish Lions
Leonard Enright, hurler; Patrickswell; Limerick; 3 GAA All Stars Awards
Connie Finnan, darts player; Garryowen; World Grand Prix Last 16: 2013 
Steve Finnan, soccer player; Liverpool F.C.; Republic of Ireland (50 Caps)
Al Finucane, soccer player; Limerick FC; Waterford United FC; Republic of Ireland (11 Caps)
Kevin Fitzpatrick, soccer player; Limerick FC; Republic of Ireland (1 Cap)
John Flanagan, athlete; 3 time Olympic gold medallist with the US in the hammer throw (1900, 1904, 1908)
Jerry Flannery, rugby player; Shannon RFC; Munster; Ireland (21 Caps)
Anthony Foley, rugby player; Shannon RFC; Munster Rugby; Ireland (62 Caps); European Rugby Cup winning captain – Munster, 2006
Mark Foley, hurler; Adare; Limerick; 2 GAA All-Stars Awards
Seán Foley, hurler; Patrickswell; Limerick; 1 All-Ireland – 1973; 1 GAA All Stars Awards
Johnny Gavin, soccer player; Limerick FC; Norwich City FC; Tottenham Hotspur FC; Watford FC; Crystal Palace FC; Republic of Ireland (7 Caps)
Tommy Gaynor, soccer player; Limerick FC; Shamrock Rovers FC; Dundalk; Nottingham Forest; Millwall; Cork City; Bohemians; Athlone Town; Kilkenny City; PFAI Player of the Year 1984/85
Don Givens, soccer player; Irish international 1969–81
Eamonn Grimes, hurler; South Liberties; Limerick; 2 GAA All Stars Awards; All-Ireland winning captain 1973; Texaco Hurler of the Year, 1973
Pat Hartigan, hurler; South Liberties; Limerick; 1 All-Ireland – 1973; 5 GAA All Stars Awards
John Hayes, rugby player; Bruff RFC; Shannon RFC; Munster; Ireland (84 Caps)
Willie Hayes, soccer player; Limerick FC; Torquay United FC; Wrexham FC; Republic of Ireland (1 Cap)
Marcus Horan, rugby player; Shannon RFC; Munster; Ireland (56 Caps)
Mike Houlihan, hurler; Kilmallock; Limerick; 2 GAA All-Stars Awards
Des Kennedy, soccer player; Limerick FC; Galway United FC
Gary Kirby, hurler; Patrickswell; Limerick; 4 GAA All Stars Awards
Con Leahy, athlete, Olympic Medallist with Great Britain & Ireland – high jump silver (1908) 
Patrick Leahy, athlete, Olympic Medallist with Great Britain & Ireland – high jump silver (1900), long jump bronze (1904)
Andy Lee, boxer; St. Francis' Boxing Club; European Amateur Boxing Championships – bronze (2002), silver (2004), WBO Middleweight Champion
Becky Lynch, professional wrestler; currently signed under WWE in the Raw brand
Sam Lynch, rower; St. Michael's Rowing Club; Ireland; World Champion Single Sculler 2000 & 2001
John Mackey, hurler; Ahane; Limerick; 3 All-Irelands – 1934, 1936 and 1940
Mick Mackey, hurler; Ahane; Limerick; 3 All-Irelands – 1934, 1936 and 1940; GAA Hurling Team of the Millennium
 Ger McDonnell, mountaineer; first Irishman to summit K-2
Joe McKenna, hurler; South Liberties; Limerick; 1 All-Ireland – 1973; 6 GAA All Stars Awards
Conor Murray, rugby player; Munster; Ireland; British and Irish Lions
Conor Niland, tennis player; international professional tennis player
Jim O'Brien, hurler;  Bruree; Limerick; 1 All-Ireland – 1973; 1 GAA All Stars Award
Paul O'Connell, rugby player; Young Munster; Munster; Ireland (52 Caps); British and Irish Lions; European Rugby Cup winning captain – Munster, 2008
William O'Connor, darts player; Cappamore; World Grand Prix Last 32: 2010, 2011, 2012, 2015
Liam O'Donoghue, hurler; Mungret; Limerick; 1 All-Ireland – 1973; 1 GAA All Stars Award
Frank O'Mara, athlete; World Indoor 3000m champion 
Jackie Power, hurler; Ahane; Limerick; 2 All-Irelands – 1936 and 1940; All-Ireland winning manager 1973
Joe Quaid, hurler; Murroe-Boher; Limerick; 2 GAA All-Star Awards
Tommy Quaid, hurler; Feohanagh; Limerick; 1 GAA All Stars Awards
Patrick Ryan, athlete, Olympic gold medallist with the US in the hammer throw (1920)
Paddy Waldron, first-class cricketer
David Wallace, rugby player; Garryowen; Munster; Ireland (46 Caps); British and Irish Lions
Paul Wallace, rugby player; Garryowen; Saracens; Munster; Ireland (45 Caps); British and Irish Lions
Richard Wallace, rugby player; Garryowen; Munster; Ireland (29 Caps); British and Irish Lions
Johnny Walsh, soccer player; Limerick FC; Republic of Ireland (1 Cap)

Military
Walter Burke purser on HMS Victory, held Lord Nelson when he died (1736–1815)
Nathaniel Burslem, recipient of the Victoria Cross
Cornelius Colbert, Irish rebel and pioneer of Fianna Éireann
Michael Colivet, Irish rebel, Commandant of 1916 Rising in Limerick and first TD for Limerick in Dáil Éireann
Edward Daly, Commandant of 1916 Rising – Four Courts
John Danaher, recipient of the Victoria Cross
Tiede Herrema, Dutch businessman based in Limerick, abducted by the IRA in 1973
Peter Lacy, Russian Field Marshal
Sir Thomas Myles, surgeon, sailor, Home Ruler and gun-runner (1857–1937)
Michael O'Rourke, recipient of the Victoria Cross
Seán South, IRA volunteer killed on active service in 1957

Historical
Margaretta Eagar (1863-1936), governess to the last Russian Royal Family
Mary Jane Kelly (c. 1863-1888), Jack the Ripper victim
Rosina Bulwer Lytton (1802-1882), author
William Monsell, 1st Baron Emly (1812–1894), statesman and reformer
John T. Mullock (1807-1869), Roman Catholic bishop of St. John's, Newfoundland (1850–1869)
Mary O'Connell (1814-1897), nurse during the American Civil War.

Religion
Christine Frost (born 1937), Catholic religious sister
Mary Kostka Kirby (1863–1952), New Zealand catholic nun

See also

List of Irish people

References

Limerick
 
 
People